The Nothing to hide argument is a  privacy-related argument.

Nothing to hide may also refer to:

Books
Nothing to Hide: The False Tradeoff Between Privacy and Security, a book by Daniel J. Solove
Nothing to Hide: A Dancer's Life, the autobiography of Robert La Fosse

Film and TV
Nothing to Hide (1981 film), a 1981 adult film directed by Anthony Spinelli
Nothing to Hide (2018 film), also known as Le Jeu, a 2018 French film directed by Fred Cavayé
"Nothing to Hide" (Heroes), an episode from the first season of the television series Heroes

Music

Albums
Nothing to Hide (album), a 2000 album by the band In My Eyes
Nothing to Hide, a 2005 album by JD & The Straight Shot

Songs
"Nothing to Hide", a song by Chris Montez
"Nothing to Hide", a 1971 song by Tommy James 
"Nothing to Hide", a song by Harpo
"Nothing to Hide", a song by Pussycat
"Nothing to Hide", a song by Richard Marx from Paid Vacation

Other uses
Nothing to Hide campaign, a 2009 TV advertising campaign for Air New Zealand
 Nothing to Hide (magic show), a theatrical magic show created and performed by Derek DelGaudio and Helder Guimaraes
 Nothing to Hide, a 2013 video game prototype by Nicky Case